Bembidion lampros is a species of ground beetle native to Europe. It is a generalist predator, yet depending on what it consumes their fecundity and larval development time can change.

References

lampros
Beetles described in 1784
Beetles of Europe